Psilocorsis is a genus of moths of the family Depressariidae.

Species
 Psilocorsis amydra Hodges, 1961
 Psilocorsis arguta Hodges, 1961
 Psilocorsis argyropasta Walsingham, 1912
 Psilocorsis carpocapsella (Walker, 1864)
 Psilocorsis cirrhoptera Hodges, 1961
 Psilocorsis cryptolechiella Chambers, 1872
 Psilocorsis exagitata Meyrick, 1926
 Psilocorsis indalma Walsingham, 1912
 Psilocorsis fatula Hodges, 1975
 Psilocorsis melanophthalma Meyrick, 1928
 Psilocorsis minerva Meyrick, 1928
 Psilocorsis propriella (Zeller, 1877)
 Psilocorsis purpurascens Walsingham, 1912
 Psilocorsis quercicella Clemens, 1860
 Psilocorsis reflexella Clemens, 1860

References

 
Depressariinae